Douglas J. Moo (born March 15, 1950) is a Reformed New Testament scholar who, after teaching for more than twenty years at Trinity Evangelical Divinity School in Illinois, has served as Blanchard Professor of New Testament at the Wheaton College Graduate School since 2000. He received his Ph.D. at the University of St. Andrews, in St. Andrews, Scotland.

Moo has published several theological works and commentaries on the Bible; notable among them are An Introduction to the New Testament (with D.A. Carson and Leon Morris) and The Epistle to the Romans (part of the New International Commentary on the New Testament series).  His current research interests are Romans, Pauline theology (and exegesis) and environmental theology.  He has been a member of the translation committee that produced the NIV and TNIV since 1996, and is its current Chair. He previously edited Trinity Journal.

In 2014, a Festschrift was published in his honour. Studies in the Pauline Epistles: Essays in Honor of Douglas J. Moo included contributions from G. K. Beale, Craig Blomberg, James Dunn, Grant R. Osborne, Thomas R. Schreiner, and N. T. Wright.

Works

Books

Edited by

Articles

Training course

Festschrift

See also
Biblical hermeneutics

Notes

External links
Faculty page at Wheaton College

American Christian theologians
American biblical scholars
1950 births
Living people
DePauw University alumni
Wheaton College (Illinois) faculty
People from La Porte, Indiana
New Testament scholars
Academic journal editors
Alumni of the University of St Andrews
Trinity International University alumni
Trinity International University faculty